Burn Advocates Network (BAN) is a nonprofit organization that supports burn survivors as they face the challenges of recovery, rehabilitation, and reintegration. The organization operates three pediatric burn camps and a burn care network. BAN was founded in 2008 and expanded its international activity following the Haiti earthquake, which left an estimated 1,000 burn survivors without proper care.

Operations

Based in Teaneck, New Jersey, Burn Advocates Network operates three pediatric burn camps:

 Camp Sababa - Israel’s first burn camp, was founded in 2009 and operates in cooperation with Schneider Hospital for Children. Camp takes place in Kfar Galim, a youth village outside of Haifa.
 Camp Karma - India's first burn camp, was founded in 2013 and operates in cooperation KEM Hospital. Camp takes place in Rivergate Resort, outside of Mumbai.
Camp Samba - Launched in São Paulo in 2017.

Today there are approximately 60 burn camps worldwide, 31 of them based in the United States and registered at the International Association of Burn Camps. Burn camps typically include accommodation, offer various activities such as arts and crafts, cooking sessions and drumming circles, and are tuition-free for campers. The age of participants varies from 6-18 and the number of participants from 15-100. Several academic studies have demonstrated that burn survivors who participated in burn camps experienced decreased isolation, improved self-esteem and improved social skills.

BAN also initiated the DR & Haiti Burn Care Network, which seeks to improve burn care and treatment in the region. Since 2010, BAN has treated over 200 burn survivors through 6 medical missions, distributed over 50,000 tons of medical supplies and equipment, and sponsored several surgeons on medical exchange programs. In order to improve communication between aid workers and local victims, BAN launched the iOS app "French Creole for Aid Workers" in 2011.

History
Founder Samuel Davis, trial lawyer and lecturer, has worked with burn survivors with serious injuries for over 30 years. After witnessing the positive effects of burn camps on his clients, he began sponsoring individual burn survivors from around the world. The local operation quickly expanded into an international organization, following the Haiti earthquake. In 2012, Samuel Davis received the Clarence Darrow Award for his ongoing philanthropic work.

Funding

The organization is funded through private donations and fundraising events. By relying on volunteers and interns, BAN is able to keep its camps free for all participants.

References

Health charities in the United States
Burns
Medical and health organizations based in New Jersey